Otokar URAL is a 4x4 armoured vehicle designed for police, law enforcement and paramilitary forces.

It is manufactured by Otokar Otomotiv ve Savunma Sanayi A.Ş (simply Otokar), a Turkish military vehicles manufacturer headquartered in Sakarya, Turkey.

It was first unveiled at IDEF 2013

Design 
Based on a modular platform, its design enables it to be configured with a variety of different weapons/equipment enabling it to perform a variety of missions. In Eurosatory 2014, it was  displayed with an Otokar designed, remotely controlled stabilized weapon station compromising of a 7.62mm/5.56mm machine gun designed for infantry fighting vehicles. Depending on configuration, it can carry up to 9 troops.

Operators 
 : 126 vehicles delivered to The General Directorate of Security (Turkish: Emniyet Genel Müdürlüğü, EGM), the civilian police force responsible for law enforcement in Turkey.
 : Ministry of Internal Affairs

References

Armoured vehicles
Military vehicles introduced in the 2010s